The elegant lobulia (Lobulia elegans) is a species of skink found in New Guinea.

It has a distinct geometric checkerboard pattern on its back.

Names
It is known as pymakol in the Kalam language of Papua New Guinea.

Habitat
Lobulia elegans is often found in Nothofagus beech trees at higher altitudes, as well as in gardens and clearings at lower altitudes.

References

Lobulia
Reptiles described in 1897
Reptiles of Papua New Guinea
Endemic fauna of Papua New Guinea
Taxa named by George Albert Boulenger
Skinks of New Guinea